Yonah Acosta Gonzales, usually credited as Yonah Acosta, is a Cuban actor and ballet dancer. He is most noted for his performance in the 2020 film Without Havana (Sin la Habana), for which he received a Prix Iris nomination for Revelation of the Year at the 24th Quebec Cinema Awards.

The nephew of dancer and director Carlos Acosta, he has danced with the Cuban National Ballet, the English National Ballet and the Bayerisches Staatsballett.

References

External links

21st-century Cuban male actors
Cuban male ballet dancers
Cuban male film actors
English National Ballet dancers
Living people
Year of birth missing (living people)